Nigel Clive Cosby Trench, 7th Baron Ashtown,  (27 October 1916 – 6 March 2010) was a British peer and diplomat.

Trench was born in St Albans, the son of Clive Newcome Trench and Kathleen Maud Marion McIvor. He was educated at Eton and Corpus Christi College, Cambridge.

After rising to the rank of Major in the King's Royal Rifle Corps during the Second World War, Trench spent some thirty years in the British foreign service, with postings which included Tokyo and Washington D.C., before serving as British Ambassador to the Republic of Korea (1969–71) and then to Portugal (1974–76).

In 1990, after his retirement, he inherited the Irish peerage of Baron Ashtown from his cousin Christopher Trench, 6th Baron Ashtown.

Honours

Trench was appointed a Commander of the Order of St. Michael and St. George in the 1966 Birthday Honours. He was knighted in the same order in the 1976 Birthday Honours.

Personal life
He married Marcelle Catherine Clotterbooke Patijn van Kloetinge in 1939, with whom he had one son, Roderick Trench, 8th Baron Ashtown. He succeeded a cousin as Baron Ashtown in 1990. His wife died in 1994.

Lord Ashtown then married Dorothea Mary Elizabeth Minchin (d. 20 December 2019), former wife of Hans Heinrich XVII, 4th Prince of Pless, in 1997.

He died in London in 2010 and was succeeded as Baron Ashtown by his son, Roderick.

References

 Charles Mosley, editor, Burke's Peerage and Baronetage, 106th edition, 2 volumes (Crans, Switzerland: Burke's Peerage (Genealogical Books) Ltd, 1999), volume 1, page 123.

1916 births
2010 deaths
People from St Albans
Alumni of Corpus Christi College, Cambridge
Ambassadors of the United Kingdom to Portugal
Ambassadors of the United Kingdom to South Korea
Nigel
British Army personnel of World War II
Diplomatic peers
Knights Commander of the Order of St Michael and St George
King's Royal Rifle Corps officers
People educated at Eton College
Nigel